Heliocausta is a genus of moths of the family Oecophoridae.

Species
Heliocausta floridula  Meyrick, 1913
Heliocausta oecophorella  (Walker, 1864)
Heliocausta pelosticta  Meyrick, 1883
Heliocausta sarcodes  Turner, 1917
Heliocausta semiruptella  (Walker, 1864)
Heliocausta triphaenatella  (Walker, 1864)
Heliocausta unguentaria  Meyrick, 1921

References

Markku Savela's ftp.funet.fi

 
Oecophorinae